The 2012 IFSC Climbing World Championships, the 12th edition, were held in Paris, France, from 12 to 16 September 2012.

Medal winners overview

Lead

Women 
65 athletes attended the women's lead competition.

Men 
102 athletes attended the men's lead competition.

Bouldering

Women 
66 athletes attended the women's bouldering competition.

Men 
114 athletes attended the men's bouldering competition.

Speed

Women 
48 athletes competed in the women's speed climbing event.

Men 
55 athletes competed in the men's speed climbing event.

Combined

Women

Men

References 

IFSC Climbing World Championships
World Climbing Championships
International sports competitions hosted by France